The Bharatiya Janata Party, or simply,  BJP Assam (BJP;), 
is the state unit of the Bharatiya Janata Party of the Assam. Its head office is situated at the 'Atal Bihari Vajpayee Bhawan' Near Hengrabari L.P. School Hengrabari, Guwahati-781 036, Assam, India. The current president of BJP Assam is Bhabesh Kalita.

In 2016 BJP formed Government at Assam state for the first time under leadership of Sarbananda Sonowal from there it is still a ruling party at Assam and had 2 Chief Ministers till date Sarbananda Sonowal from 2016-2021 and Himanta Biswa Sarma from 2021–present.

History

Prominent members

Lok Sabha members

Rajya Sabha members

In General Election

In State Election

In local elections

Municipal corporation election results

Autonomous District Council election

Legislative leaders

Chief ministers

See also
Asom Gana Parishad
United People's Party Liberal
Bodoland People's Front
National Democratic Alliance
North East Democratic Alliance
Bharatiya Janata Party
Meghalaya Democratic Alliance
United Democratic Alliance, Nagaland
 Bharatiya Janata Party, Gujarat
 Bharatiya Janata Party, Uttar Pradesh
 Bharatiya Janata Party, Madhya Pradesh
 State units of the Bharatiya Janata Party

Notes

References

Works cited
 

Bharatiya Janata Party
Bharatiya Janata Party by state or union territory